Brian Edward Messiter is an Australian former rugby league footballer who played in the 1950s and 1960s.

Career
A local junior from the Sutherland Gravediggers JRLFC, Messiter played on the wing in two winning grand final teams at the St George Dragons.

A first grade player at St George for only three seasons between 1958 and 1960, Messiter featured in two premiership winning teams, the 1958 Grand Final and the famous, undefeated  Saints team that won the 1959 Grand Final. His place in the team was taken by the emerging Johnny King in 1960 and he retired the following season.

References

1938 births
Living people
Australian rugby league players
Rugby league players from Sydney
Rugby league wingers
St. George Dragons players